Western Cree syllabics are a variant of Canadian Aboriginal syllabics used to write Plains Cree, Woods Cree and the western dialects of Swampy Cree.  It is used for all Cree dialects west of approximately the Manitoba–Ontario border in Canada, as opposed to Eastern Cree syllabics.  It is also occasionally used by a few Cree speakers in the United States.

Phonology of languages using Western Cree syllabics

Western syllabics use only those characters needed to write the phonemes of the western dialects.  The table below demonstrates the phonemes present in Western Cree dialects.  Each sound is presented with a transcription in the International Phonetic Alphabet along with the characters used to represent the sound in the Standard Roman Orthography used to teach Plains Cree.

Standard Roman Orthography consonants sound for the most part like their English equivalents.

Western Cree dialects have between 6 and 7 vowels distinguishing between short and long vowels.  Short vowels are written standard Latin characters while long vowels are written either with a macron or a circumflex.  , written  is always long and has no short counterpart.

Inventory

Cree syllabics uses different glyphs to indicate consonants, and changes the orientation of these glyphs to indicate the vowel that follows it.  The basic principles of Canadian syllabic writing are outlined in the article for Canadian Aboriginal syllabics.

Notes:

Note that the th-series closely resembles the y-series characters.  The th phoneme in Woods Cree appears where a y is found in Plains or an n in Swampy Cree.  Recognising the relationship between the th and y sounds, Cree writers use a modification of the y-series.

In addition to these characters, western Cree syllabics indicates the w phoneme by placing a dot after the syllable. (This is the reverse of the Eastern Cree convention.) Thus, the syllable wa is indicated with ᐘ, pwi by ᐽ and so on.  The dot used to mark the w can be combined with the dot marking length.  The syllable wâ is marked as ᐚ and pwî as ᐿ.  The dot used to indicate w is placed before the syllable in Eastern Cree syllabics.  This and the way finals are written are the two principal differences between eastern and western Cree syllabics.

The dot placed above syllables with long vowels is often dropped in real texts unless necessary to disambiguate the word. Long and short vowels may be written identically and require context to disambiguate.

Also, western Cree writers may use the character ᙮ to indicate the end of sentence, instead of the Roman alphabet period so that it is not confused with the diacritic indicating the w sound.

An example of Plains Cree written in western syllabics:

English translation:

The young people then began to speak in the language of his ancestry – Nêhiyawêwin (Plains Cree language).  Unfortunately the young man could not make out what they were saying even though he was of the same nation; Nêhiyaw (Plains Cree people).

External links
Cree syllabics at languagegeek.com (Website has downloadable Unicode syllabics fonts)

References

ᓀᐦᐃᔭᐍᐏᐣ: ᐃᑘᐏᓇ / nēhiýawēwin: itwēwina / Cree: Words  Compiled by Arok Wolvengrey.  Canadian Plains Research Center, University of Regina, Saskatchewan.  2001. 

Cree language
Canadian Aboriginal syllabics